Ernest W. Riedel (July 13, 1901 – March 26, 1983) was an American sprint canoeist who competed from the late 1930s to the late 1940s. Competing in two Summer Olympics, he won a bronze medal in the K-1 10000 m event at Berlin in 1936. He was associated with the Pendleton Canoe Club of New York.

A native of New York City, he died in Dade County, Florida.

References

DatabaseOlympics.com profile
Sports-reference.com profile

1901 births
1983 deaths
American male canoeists
Canoeists at the 1936 Summer Olympics
Canoeists at the 1948 Summer Olympics
Olympic bronze medalists for the United States in canoeing
Sportspeople from New York City
Medalists at the 1936 Summer Olympics